Tindale Crescent is a place in County Durham, in England. It is situated immediately to the south-west of Bishop Auckland.

Villages in County Durham